The Mixed 50 metre pistol SH1 event at the 2012 Summer Paralympics took place on 6 September at the Royal Artillery Barracks in Woolwich.

The event consisted of two rounds: a qualifier and a final. In the qualifier, each shooter fired 60 shots with a pistol at 50 metres distance from the "standing" (interpreted to include seated in wheelchairs) position. Scores for each shot were in increments of 1, with a maximum score of 10.

The top 8 shooters in the qualifying round moved on to the final round. There, they fired an additional 10 shots. These shots scored in increments of .1, with a maximum score of 10.9. The total scored from all 70 shots were used to determine the final ranking.

Qualification round

Q Qualified for final

Final

References

Shooting at the 2012 Summer Paralympics